The men's 100 metre freestyle event at the 2000 Summer Olympics took place on 19–20 September at the Sydney International Aquatic Centre in Sydney, Australia. There were 73 competitors from 66 nations. Nations have been limited to two swimmers each since the 1984 Games.

Summary

Netherlands' Pieter van den Hoogenband stormed home on the final length to claim his second Olympic gold medal at these Games. He posted a time of 48.30 to hold off Russia's defending Olympic champion Alexander Popov by almost two-fifths of a second (0.40). It was the Netherlands' first medal in the men's 100 metre freestyle. Failing to attain a third straight triumph in the same event, Popov settled for the silver in 48.69. Popov became only the second man to win three medals in the 100 metre freestyle, the first since Duke Kahanamoku in 1912–1924. Meanwhile, U.S. swimmer Gary Hall, Jr. took bronze with a 48.73 time. Hall was the 11th man to win two medals in the event.

After breaking a split world record in the 4×100 m freestyle relay on the opening night, Australia's overwhelming favorite Michael Klim missed out the podium in a close race against Hall by a hundredth of a second, finishing with a time of 48.74. Klim was followed in fifth by Hall's teammate Neil Walker (49.09), and in sixth by Sweden's three-time Olympian Lars Frölander (49.22). Russia's Denis Pimankov (49.36) and another Aussie Chris Fydler (49.44) rounded out the finale.

Earlier in the semifinals, Van den Hoogenband cleared a 48-second barrier to set a new world record of 47.84, slashing 0.34 seconds off the mark set by Klim from the relay.

One of the most popular highlights in the event took place in the first heat. Dubbed as Eric the Eel, Equatorial Guinea's Eric Moussambani received a dubious honor of being the slowest Olympic swimmer in history. Two other swimmers, Niger's Karim Bare and Tajikistan's Farkhod Oripov, plunged into the pool and were cast out of the race under a no false-start rule, leaving Moussambani as the last man standing. Cheered by a large crowd, he finished a one-man heat in 1:52.72, nearly seven seconds slower than a winning time by Van den Hoogenband over double the distance a day before.

Background

This was the 23rd appearance of the men's 100 metre freestyle. The event has been held at every Summer Olympics except 1900 (when the shortest freestyle was the 200 metres), though the 1904 version was measured in yards rather than metres.

Seven of the eight finalists from the 1996 Games returned: two-time gold medalist Alexander Popov of Russia, silver medalist Gary Hall, Jr. of the United States, bronze medalist (and 1992 silver medalist) Gustavo Borges of Brazil, fourth-place finisher Pieter van den Hoogenband of the Netherlands, fifth-place finisher Fernando Scherer of Brazil, sixth-place finisher Pavlo Khnykin of Ukraine, and eighth-place finisher Francisco Sánchez of Venezuela.

Popov had recovered from a near-fatal stabbing in 1996 to win the 1997 European championship and repeat as world champion in 1998. His 1994 world record had stood until the start of the Games; in the freestyle relays, however, hometown hopeful Michael Klim (the 1998 world championship runner-up) had broken that record with his first leg split. Van den Hoogenband won the 200 metre freestyle earlier in Sydney.

The Republic of the Congo, the Czech Republic, Equatorial Guinea, the Ivory Coast, Mauritius, Mongolia, Niger, Nigeria, Slovenia, and Tajikistan each made their debut in the event. The United States made its 22nd appearance, most of any nation, having missed only the boycotted 1980 Games.

Competition format

This freestyle swimming competition returned to the three-round format used from 1948 to 1980, abandoning the A/B final format used between 1984 and 1996. The competition consisted of three rounds: heats, semifinals, and a final. The swimmers with the best 16 times in the heats advanced to the semifinals. The swimmers with the best 8 times in the semifinals advanced to the final. Swim-offs were used as necessary to break ties for advancement to the next round.

Records

Prior to this competition, the existing world and Olympic records were as follows.

Pieter van den Hoogenband set a new world record of 47.84 seconds in the second semifinal.

Schedule

All times are Australian Eastern Standard Time (UTC+10)

Results

Heats

Semifinals

Final

References

External links
Official Olympic Report

F
Men's events at the 2000 Summer Olympics